Lansing is a village in Cook County, Illinois, United States. Lansing is a south suburb of Chicago. The population was 29,076 at the 2020 census.

Geography
Lansing is located at  (41.565785, -87.545791).

Lansing sits on the Calumet Shoreline, an ancient shoreline of Lake Michigan. This shoreline runs along Ridge Road.

Surrounding areas
Lansing is bordered by South Holland to the northwest, Calumet City to the north, Hammond to the northeast, Munster to the east and southeast, Lynwood to the south, Glenwood to the southwest, and Thornton to the west.

 Calumet City
 South Holland    Hammond
  Thornton      Munster 
 Glenwood    Munster
 Lynwood

Government
The current Mayor of Lansing is Patty Eidam.

Lansing is represented in the United States Congress by Representative Robin Kelly, of Illinois's 2nd congressional district, as well as Senators Dick Durbin and Tammy Duckworth in the United States Senate.

History
The first family to settle in Lansing was that of August Hildebrandt in 1843. Henry, George, and John Lansing settled the area in 1846, which was incorporated in 1893. Early settlement in the village was primarily by Dutch and German immigrants. Industrial development of the surrounding Calumet region attracted immigrants from Ireland and Eastern Europe to the village in the 20th century. These settlement patterns are reflected in Lansing's current demographics; according to the census the top five ancestries that were in Lansing in 2000 were German (17%), Polish (13%), Irish (13%), Dutch (11%), and Italian (7%). However, according to City-data.com 2016 estimates, these ancestries began to change in the mid-90s and early 2000s, when most residents were of African American ancestry (8,871), followed by Latinos (4,183), and Asian (Southeast Asian) (255).

Demographics

As of the 2020 census there were 29,076 people, 10,741 households, and 6,818 families residing in the village. The racial makeup of the village was 46.62% African American, 32.17% White, 0.72% Native American, 0.93% Asian, 0.02% Pacific Islander, 10.67% from other races, and 8.88% from two or more races. Hispanic or Latino of any race were 20.61% of the population.

There were 10,741 households, out of which 52.85% had children under the age of 18 living with them, 35.18% were married couples living together, 22.04% had a female householder with no husband present, and 36.52% were non-families. 31.80% of all households were made up of individuals, and 10.87% had someone living alone who was 65 years of age or older. The average household size was 3.23 and the average family size was 2.56.

The village's age distribution consisted of 24.2% under the age of 18, 7.2% from 18 to 24, 24.8% from 25 to 44, 26.6% from 45 to 64, and 17.2% who were 65 years of age or older. The median age was 40.2 years. For every 100 females, there were 77.7 males. For every 100 females age 18 and over, there were 73.6 males.

The median income for a household in the village was $57,659, and the median income for a family was $70,775. Males had a median income of $47,236 versus $31,684 for females. The per capita income for the village was $28,708. About 12.4% of families and 16.7% of the population were below the poverty line, including 27.8% of those under age 18 and 5.3% of those age 65 or over.

Note: the US Census treats Hispanic/Latino as an ethnic category. This table excludes Latinos from the racial categories and assigns them to a separate category. Hispanics/Latinos can be of any race.

Education
 College
 Visible Music College Chicago Branch
 Public high schools
 Thornton Fractional South
 Private high schools
 American School of Correspondence
 Public primary and middle schools
 Memorial Junior High School
 Nathan Hale Elementary School
 Heritage Middle School
 Oak Glen Elementary School
 Reavis Elementary School
 Coolidge Elementary School
 Private primary and middle schools
Saint Ann Elementary School
Lansing Christian School
 Saint John Lutheran School
Eagle Academy

Notable people 

 Bill W. Balthis (1936–2016), Illinois state representative, mayor of Lansing, and businessman
 Tom Gorzelanny, pitcher for the Milwaukee Brewers, spent part of his childhood in Lansing
 Curtis Granderson, outfielder for the New York Mets, graduated from Thornton Fractional South High School
 Harry Smith, former co-anchor for CBS' The Early Show and the host of A&E's Biography series
 Pierre Thomas, running back for the New Orleans Saints, graduated from Thornton Fractional South High School
 Jack E. Walker, Illinois politician, practiced law in Lansing.
 Nnamdi Ogbonnaya, Musician

See also 
Lansing Municipal Airport
North Creek Woods

References

External links
Village of Lansing official website
Lansing Public Library
Lansing's Neighborhood Network Cable Channel 4
Lan-Oak Park District, Lansing's park district
Lansing Area Chamber of Commerce
Thornton Fractional School District 215
Sunnybrook School District 171
Lansing School District 158
Lansing Municipal Airport

 
Chicago metropolitan area
Villages in Cook County, Illinois
Villages in Illinois
Populated places established in 1843
1843 establishments in Illinois
Majority-minority cities and towns in Cook County, Illinois